A libertine is one free from the restraint of social norms and religious morals.

Libertine may also refer to:
Synagogue of the Libertines
Ragusian libertine, a silver coin used in the Republic of Ragusa (modern-day Dubrovnik, Croatia)
Linux Libertine, a free software Unicode typeface by the Libertine Open Fonts Project
Libertine (magazine), the student magazine of Flinders University, South Australia
 Libertine, an American fashion label run by Johnson Hartig
 "Libertine" (song), a 1986 song by Mylène Farmer
 Libertine (Gene album), 2001
 Libertine (Silkworm album), 1994
 Libertine (Liv Kristine album), 2012
 "Libertine", a song by The Buck Pets on their album Mercurotones

People
Eve Libertine (born 1949), stage name of Bronwyn Lloyd Jones, a lead vocalist of the anarcho-punk band Crass
Saint Libertine (Libertinus, Libertino), Christian bishop of Agrigento, Sicily

See also
The Libertine (disambiguation)
Libertine novel, an 18th-century literary genre associated with libertines
The Libertines, an English indie/rock band
The Libertines (album), the second album produced by the band
I, Libertine, a novel, a literary hoax that was made real